Metheringham is an English village and civil parish in the North Kesteven district of Lincolnshire. The population of the civil parish at the 2011 census was 3,605. The centre of the village is a conservation area.

History
The village is a documented settlement in the Domesday Book of 1086 and is thought to date from Saxon times. It appears to be associated with the name "Medrich". The addition of the plural ending "-es" together with the familiar "-ham" ending is thought to have produced "Medrichesham" (the homestead of Medrich), which in time became corrupted into the modern name of the village. The earliest surviving document relating specifically to the village dates from 24 June 1314, in the reign of Edward II. In July 1599, a great fire left only a few houses standing. It started in a gully that ran the length of the village street.

White's 1842 Directory of Lincolnshire called Metheringham "a large improving village, on a gentle declivity, between Lincoln Heath and the Cardyke navigation, 9 miles S. E. of Lincoln. Its parish increased its population from 536 in 1801, to 880 in 1831, to 1197 in 1841,and contains 5682A[cres], 1R[ood], 32P[erches] of land." It also notes, "An ancient Cross, which stood in the village, was replaced by a new one in 1835, at the cost of about £25, and a market is now held round it on Saturday evenings. The drainage of the parish is aided by a steam engine of 25-horse power, and has dried an ancient spring called Holywell." It describes the church (see below) and adds, "Here is a Wesleyan Chapel, erected in 1840. A School was established by subscription in 1841, and there is a flourishing Sick Club, and also a Cow Club. The poor parishioners have 3R.37P. of land left by one Colley; and an annuity of £3, left by John Ellis in 1829."

The village war memorial records the names of 42 men who died for their country in the First World War and eight who fell in the Second World War.

Notable person
The village was the birthplace of H. F. Ellis (1907–2000), a writer who developed the comic schoolmaster character A. J. Wentworth B. A. in the magazine Punch and later in The New Yorker.

Geography
It lies on the north–south B1188 between Ruskington and Branston, and on the east–west B1202 and B1189 roads. The railway station is in Station Road (B1189).

The centre of the village is a conservation area. To the west and the A15 is Metheringham Heath, on which is a SSSI at a local quarry. To the east is Metheringham Fen, across which lies Metheringham Delph, which drains into the River Witham from where it connects to the Car Dyke near an old wartime airfield. The Metheringham Delph nature reserve at Tanvats, and Sots Hole, are nearby.

Community
Metheringham is known to locals as "Meg". The population of the built-up area was estimated at 3,595 in 2018.

The parish church  of St Wilfrid belongs to the Metheringham group with Blankney and Dunston. There is a Methodist church, built in 1907 by the architect Albert Edward Lambert. San Damiano House is one of five houses in England of the Community of St. Francis, a Franciscan Anglican religious order for women.

The village has a primary school, a High Street cafe, a Co-op store, and a traditional butcher's shop, which has been trading for over 80 years. It has four pubs: the Star & Garter in Prince's Street, the White Hart Inn, the Lincolnshire Poacher in High Street, and the Londesborough Arms.

Metheringham is served by an hourly daytime, Monday-to-Saturday bus between Boston and Lincoln, provided by Brylaine. This runs less frequently on Sundays. Other services run to South Kyme (P. C. Coaches) and to Sleaford (Road Car). There are regular direct Monday-to-Saturday train services to Lincoln, Doncaster, Sleaford, Spalding, Peterborough, and Leicester.

See also
Metheringham railway station
Spring line settlements
Metheringham Windmill
RAF Metheringham

References

External links 

Metheringham primary school
Metheringham and District Community website
St Wilfrid's church
Metheringham Airfield
"Jet-powered luge - a tea tray on wheels", Lincolnshire Echo YouTube channel
Metheringham Football Club

Villages in Lincolnshire
Sites of Special Scientific Interest in Lincolnshire
Civil parishes in Lincolnshire
North Kesteven District